Fires Were Started is a 1943 British film written and directed by Humphrey Jennings. Filmed in documentary style, it shows the lives of firefighters through the Blitz during the Second World War. The film uses actual firemen (including Cyril Demarne) rather than professional actors.

Production
Exterior shots were filmed on location, while the interior scenes were shot at Pinewood Studios. Jennings's first cut of the film was titled I Was a Fireman and ran to 74 minutes. This was cut down to 65 minutes and released as Fires Were Started.

Critical reception
Film critics mostly praised the film for its realism and documentary value, despite its reconstructions. Dilys Powell, of the Sunday Times declared its authenticity to be 'moving and terrifying'.

See also
 BFI Top 100 British films

References

Bibliography

External links
 
 

1943 films
1943 documentary films
Black-and-white documentary films
British documentary films
British World War II propaganda films
British black-and-white films
Battle of Britain films
Films about firefighting
British docufiction films
Crown Film Unit films
Films directed by Humphrey Jennings
1940s English-language films